Atergatopsis is a genus of crabs in the family Xanthidae, containing the following species:

 Atergatopsis alcocki (Laurie, 1906)
 Atergatopsis amoyensis (De Man, 1879)
 Atergatopsis germaini (A. Milne-Edwards, 1865)
 Atergatopsis granulata (A. Milne-Edwards, 1865)
 Atergatopsis immigrans (Edmondson, 1962)
 Atergatopsis inskipensis (Rathbun, 1923)
 Atergatopsis lucasii (Montrouzier, 1865)
 Atergatopsis obesa (A. Milne-Edwards, 1865)
 Atergatopsis signata (Adams & White, 1849)
 Atergatopsis tweediei (Balss, 1938)

References

Xanthoidea